Little Current Water Aerodrome  was an aerodrome located in the town of Northeastern Manitoulin and the Islands, Ontario, Canada,  west of the community of Little Current and east of Mackay's Bay. The aerodrome was accessed from private drive off North Channel Drive.

References

Defunct seaplane bases in Ontario
Transport in Manitoulin District
Buildings and structures in Manitoulin District